Lamia petrificata is an extinct species of beetle in the family Cerambycidae, that existed during the Upper Oligocene. It was described by Heyden and Heyden in 1856. It is known from Germany.

References

Lamiinae
Beetles described in 1856